The L. E. Snyder House, at the corner of Cedar and Sixth Streets in Onida, South Dakota, is a brick house built in 1911.  It was listed on the National Register of Historic Places in 1993.

It has also been known as the Hedman House and as the Voorhees House.  It has elements of American Foursquare architecture. It was designed and built by the Black Hills Company, a Deadwood architecture and contracting firm.

References

Houses on the National Register of Historic Places in South Dakota
Houses completed in 1911
Sully County, South Dakota
American Foursquare architecture